Clinica Chimica Acta, the International Journal of Clinical Chemistry is a peer-reviewed medical journal covering research  in clinical chemistry and laboratory medicine.

Abstracting and indexing 
This journal is abstracted and indexed in BIOSIS, Chemical Abstracts, Clinical Chemistry Lookout, Current Clinical Chemistry, Current Contents/Life Sciences, EMBASE, EMBiology, FRANCIS, Index Chemica, Informedicus, MEDLINE, PASCAL, Reference Update, and Scopus.

References

External links 
 

Medicinal chemistry journals
Publications established in 1956
English-language journals
Elsevier academic journals
Laboratory medicine journals